I Won the New Year's Lottery is a 1989 Italian comedy film directed by Neri Parenti. It was one of the highest-grossing Italian films of the year.

Cast
Paolo Villaggio as Paolo Ciottoli
Antonio Allocca as Rossi
Camillo Milli as the blindman
Giampaolo Saccarola as the boss
Margit Evelyn Newton as Arcangela
Ugo Bologna as the editor of the newspaper
Giulio Massimini as don Paolino
Valerio Merola as himself
Giancarlo Magalli as himself

References

External links

1989 films
Films directed by Neri Parenti
1980s Italian-language films
1989 comedy films
Italian comedy films
1980s Italian films